Limbe is a neighborhood located in the center part of the city of Blantyre, in Malawi. It is the operational headquarters and workshops for Malawi Railways.

Overview 

Blantyre merged with Limbe in 1956.

Economy
The first branch of the Commercial Bank of Malawi was opened in Limbe on 11 April 1970. Limbe is home to Malawi Pharmacies Limited and Illovo Sugar Malawi. Limbe is the site to many of the industries in Blantyre District. Limbe is known for Indian (East Asian) traders but there has also been an influx of Chinese owned businesses growing in the area.

Culture
Limbe has a strong Asian Malawian culture and Yao culture. The town is home to a transport museum.

Sports
Limbe is also the headquarter of  Hockey Association of Malawi (HAM).

See also 
 Chiwembe
 Railway stations in Malawi

References 

Populated places in Southern Region, Malawi